A static rope is a low-elongation rope that is designed to stretch minimally when placed under load, typically less than 5%.  In contrast, a dynamic rope is designed to stretch up to 40%. Static ropes have a wide variety of uses, for instance in fire rescue operations and caving.

Static ropes have some applications in climbing, such as hauling gear, though lead climbing is always done with a dynamic rope, since a fall on a static rope is stopped too quickly and may lead to serious injury. Abseiling, however, is best done with a static rope or with a dynamic rope with low elasticity.

See also
Kernmantle rope

References

Climbing equipment
Ropes